The Legend of the Ice People (in Swedish language Sagan om Isfolket) is a 47-volume story of a family bloodline, first published in 1982. The author of the series is Margit Sandemo. The novels are predominantly based in Scandinavia and focus on historical fact, but contain some fantastical elements. The first volume was released 1982, and the series became one of the best-selling series of novels in Scandinavia, with more than 39 million copies sold.

The series was originally written in Swedish, but has been translated into over eight languages including Norwegian, Finnish, Polish, Czech, Icelandic, Russian, Hungarian and English.

The book series is made in three parts where The Legend of the Ice People is part one. Part two is an equal/spin off series placed in the years between 1600 and 1700. It is also a prequel to book 31 The Ferry Man. (Swedish original title; Färjkarlen) Here we learn the background story of the mystical medallions that the characters, Benedikte and Sander finds. This second series is called Häxmästaren in Swedish and translates to The Warlock. The scenery throughout the second series is mostly placed on Iceland, and in Norway, Sweden and Austria. It is made off 15 books and other connections to the ice people-books is the spirits and souls of mostly Sol and Tengel the good. They come in later on in the series to help the Islandic warlock and his family.

The last part of the series is called Legenden om ljusets rike, which translates to The Legend of the Kingdom of Light. It is made of 20 books and merges the two series together. This is a sequel to both the series. It starts in the same moment and scene where The witch master ends in a cliffhanger. The story then flash forward to approximately 20–30 years after The Legend of the Ice People ends to the 1990s. The story follows the characters from the last couple of The Legend of the Ice People books, as well as their families. Some of them are Marco, Ellen, Nathaniel, and Gabriel and their children which befriends the children of the Warlocks family.

The third part of the series is somewhat different. It leans more heavily into the fantasy genre than other books in the series, and it also has elements of science fiction. It mostly take place inside the earth's crust. There is a secret kingdom in the core where time goes 12 times slower than on the surface of the earth and where the physical body stop aging. The story has two major antagonists. One is the main source of the black water that Tengel from The Legend of the Ice People got his power from. The other is the pollution and the human society's destruction of the earth. The heroes try to save the earth before it is too late and all animals and plants go extinct. The series ends in the future in the year 2080.

The complete Legend of the Ice people-series with 82 books.

Part 1. The Legend of the Ice People Original title; Sagan om Isfolket. 47 books.

Part 2. The Warlock. Original title; Häxmästaren. 15 books.

Part 3. The Legend of the Kingdom of Light. Original title; Legenden om ljusets rike. 20 books.

Plot 
The story begins in Trondheim, Norway in 1581, with the story of Silje Arngrimsdotter, and how she comes into contact with the Ice People, a community of outcasts living in an isolated valley. From there on it follows the Ice People through the centuries, with members of the clan migrating from Norway to Denmark and Sweden. Other members of the clan wind up in or visit various corners of Europe and Asia over the course of the series.

The Ice People are cursed with a terrible forefather, Tengel the Evil, whose actions resulted in at least one cursed individual being born in every generation. The cursed individuals were born with magical and mystical abilities, but also the potential for bottomless evil. The cursed men have yellow eyes, malformed shoulder blades and Mongol features, while the cursed women have yellow eyes, but are otherwise beautiful. Some cursed individuals fight their tendency for evil, whilst others embrace it.

Each book tells a separate story, very often the story of one or a few individuals of the clan. Quite often the protagonist of each book is a female, sometimes of the Ice People, but sometimes one who will marry into the clan. Many of the books also focus on the cursed individuals, their battle with their evil tendencies, and also how they utilise their powers, be it for good or evil.

Throughout the series, the cursed and their helpers steadily increase their efforts to rid the clan of the curse from Tengel the Evil. But the beastly forefather is not dead, he is merely sleeping, awaiting a special signal that will wake him up and allow him to take over the entire world with a reign of terror. Before this signal is played his descendants must find a way to defeat Tengel and rid themselves and the world of his curse. The end battle will require the birth of a very special individual as well as the help of some powerful mythological creatures.

Adaptations

Graphic novel 
There is an ongoing release of graphic novels in Swedish and Norwegian, made by Swedish cartoonists Raymond and his wife Mona Husac. They have their own publishing company named Nattfrost förlag. The first number was released in 2015 and is titled Förbannelsen in Swedish, which translates to The curse in English. The latest Graphic novel (from the time this was written) was released in the end of 2020. It was number 8 and titled Villemo after the main character in the book it is based on, book 11 in The legend of the Ice people, with the original title Blodshämnd translated to The blood feud/ The blood revenge or Vendetta.

Stage
In 2008 stage productions based upon the first three novels in the Legend of the Ice People premiered, receiving positive reviews from critics.

Television
In 2011 it was announced that a television adaptation of the series was being planned, with an estimated length of 200 episodes.

The Legend of the Ice People

References

Novels by Margit Sandemo
Novel series
Fantasy books by series